National Blood Centre of Malaysia (Malay language: Pusat Darah Negara; or its acronym, PDN) is a Malaysia’s premier blood centre for transfusion medicine and transplant.

History
Blood Bank Services in Malaysia has been initiated by a group of women volunteers of British Red Cross in 1955. Initially, the service was open on Wednesdays from 5:00 pm to 5:30 pm at the Kuala Lumpur General Hospital. On this initiative, a total of 25 to 44 donors were collected every month. Donors at that time consisted of members of the police, military, and government personnel.

After 15 years of the start of the service, as much as 5,830 units of blood and no less than 13,860 successful compatibility tests were done. Due to the increasing need of the service, the blood centre was moved to another building at Hospital Kuala Lumpur in 1971. The building is known as "National Blood Service Center" and was inaugurated in April 1972 by the Director General of Health, Ministry of Health. The National Blood Service Centre was put under the Ministry of Health and chaired by a Director. The director was responsible for all the blood services that include donor recruitment, blood collection, processing, testing, inventory management, and clinical transfusion.

Starting in 1975, the Blood Services Center has played an important role in the standardization of work procedures, methodology, reagent and blood bank equipment in all new buildings negara. In 2002, National Blood Centre was built in Jalan Tun Razak and it was inaugurated by the Prime Minister's wife Datuk Sri Hasmah Mohd Ali. The building is stately and magnificent to date in ensuring the collection of blood and ensure a safe, clean and quality.

Objectives
Creating and maintaining a safe blood donors. Provides blood, blood components that are safe, adequate and appropriate screening procedures in practice and storage in accordance with international standards. Ensure optimal patient care through the use of blood and blood products as appropriate. Establish and maintain cooperative relations through training, research and development in line with the needs of the practice and the latest technology in the medical field to date.

See also
 Ministry of Health Malaysia

References

External links
 Official Website (Malay)

Medical and health organisations based in Malaysia
Blood donation